Dorothy Dalton (September 22, 1893 – April 13, 1972) was an American silent film actress and stage personality who worked her way from a stock company to a movie career. Beginning in 1910, Dalton was a player in stock companies in Chicago; Terre Haute, Indiana; and Holyoke, Massachusetts. She joined the Keith-Albee-Orpheum Corporation vaudeville circuits. By 1914 she was working in Hollywood.

Career

Born in Chicago, Dalton made her movie debut in 1914 in Pierre of the Plains, co-starring Edgar Selwyn, followed by the lead role in Across the Pacific that same year. In 1915, she appeared with William S. Hart in The Disciple. This production came before she left Triangle Film Corporation and was signed to Thomas Harper Ince Studios. While Ince meant to cast her in mature roles, she had preferred to play ingénues.

Her role in The Disciple, however, in which she attracts a man who is not her husband, led to her being cast as a vamp. Her vamp, however, was untraditional in that she vamped unconsciously; in the words of Kay Anthony, "Not because she wanted people to think she was a full-fledged shatterer of hearts before the camera did she make pulses beat hard and fast, but because she couldn't help it: 'I guess I just must have been born that way!'" Ince's company was operative from 1919 until his death in 1924. With Ince, she played in The Price Mark and Love Letters, both co-starring William Conklin. Dalton also performed with Rudolph Valentino in Moran of the Lady Letty (1922), and with H.B. Warner in The Flame of the Yukon (1917) and The Vagabond Prince (1916). Dalton's stage career included performances as Chrysis in Aphrodite by Morris Gest in 1920.

Personal life and death

Dalton was first married to actor Lew Cody (lead actor in the Broadway version of Pierre of the Plains) in 1913, divorcing him then remarrying him in 1914 and divorcing him again. In 1924 she married theatrical producer Arthur Hammerstein, uncle of lyricist Oscar Hammerstein II and son of impresario Oscar Hammerstein I. They had a daughter, Carol Hammerstein. After this marriage, Dalton retired. Arthur Hammerstein died in 1955.

Dorothy Dalton died in 1972, age 78, at her home in Scarsdale, New York. For her contribution to the motion picture industry, Dorothy Dalton has a star on the Hollywood Walk of Fame at 1560 Vine Street.

Filmography

References

External links

 
 
 Photographs and literature

1893 births
1972 deaths
Actresses from Chicago
American film actresses
American silent film actresses
American stage actresses
People from Scarsdale, New York
Vaudeville performers
20th-century American actresses